The TUM School of Engineering and Design is a school of the Technical University of Munich, established in 2021 by the merger of four departments. As of 2022, it is structured into the Department of Aerospace & Geodesy, the Department of Architecture, the Department of Civil & Environmental Engineering, the Department of Energy & Process Engineering, the Department of Engineering Physics & Computation, the Department of Materials Engineering, the Department of Mechanical Engineering, and the Department of Mobility Systems Engineering.

Department of Aerospace and Geodesy 

The Department of Aerospace and Geodesy (ASG) is located in Ottobrunn. It combines the field of aerospace engineering  with research in satellite navigation, earth observation and the basic geodetic disciplines.

History 
The Department was founded in 2018, drawing from the Departments of Mechanical Engineering and Civil, Geo and Environmental Engineering.

Professorships 
As of 2020, there are 22 chairs and professorships at the Department:
 Aircraft Design
 Astronautics
 Astronomical and Physical Geodesy
 Autonomous Aerial Systems
 Big Geospatial Data Management
 Carbon Composites
 Cartography
 Communication and Navigation
 Data Science in Earth Observation
 eAviation
 Flight System Dynamics
 Geodesy
 Geodetic Geodynamics
 Geoinformatics
 Helicopter Technology
 Land Management and Land Tenure
 Photogrammetry and Remote Sensing
 Remote Sensing Technology
 Satellite Geodesy
 Space Propulsion
 Sustainable Future Mobility
 Turbomachinery and Flight Propulsion

Rankings 

In aerospace engineering, the Academic Ranking of World Universities ranks TUM as 17th in the world and 1st in Germany. In remote sensing, TUM is ranked 5th in the world and 1st in Germany.

In Engineering – Mechanical, Aeronautical & Manufacturing, the QS World University Rankings rank TUM as No. 21 in the world and No. 2 in Germany.

The Times Higher Education World University Rankings do not rank individual subjects, though in engineering in general, TUM is ranked 20th globally and 1st nationally.

Department of Architecture 

The Department of Architecture (ARC) is located at the Munich campus.

History 
With the foundation of the Polytechnische Schule München in 1868, architecture was first organized as the "Structural Engineering College". In 1879, Friedrich von Thiersch was appointed Professor of Architecture; his students include Max Berg, Ernst May, Otto Rudolf Salvisberg and Heinrich Tessenow. Hugo Häring and Erich Mendelsohn studied under Theodor Fischer, who was appointed Professor for Design and Urban Planning in 1908.

By 1914, the number of Chairs for Architectural Design had risen to four. During the Weimar Republic, Adolf Abel, Robert Vorhoelzer and German Bestelmeyer were among the leading members of the staff. After the Nazi party seized power, Vorhoelzer was dismissed for "building Bolshevik" and succeeded by Roderich Fick. When Bestelmeyer died, he was replaced by Julius Schulte-Frohlinde, a staunch supporter of Nazism.

After the war, teaching resumed in 1946. Robert Vorhoelzer returned to his post and organized the rebuilding of the Department. By 1968, the number of chairs increased to 17, and the number of students to 850.

With the introduction of the Bologna Process, the Department has since adopted Bachelor's and Master's programs.

Professorships 
As of 2020, the department consists of 32 professorships:
 Architectural Informatics 
 Architectural Design and Building Envelope
 Architectural Design and Conception
 Architectural Design and Construction
 Architectural Design, Rebuilding and Conservation
 Architectural Design and Participation
 Architectural Design and Timber Construction
 Building Construction and Material Science
 Building History, Building Archaeology and Conservation
 Building Realization and Robotics
 Building Technology and Climate
 Responsive Design
 Digital Fabrication
 Energy Efficient and Sustainable Design and Building
 Green Technologies in Landscape Architecture
 History of Architecture and Curatorial Practice
 Industrial Design
 Landscape Architecture and Industrial Landscape
 Landscape Architecture and Public Space
 Landscape Architecture and Regional Open Space
 Participatory Technology Design
 Recent Building Heritage Conservation
 Restoration, Art Technology and Conservation Science
 Spatial Arts and Lighting Design
 Structural Design
 Sustainable Urbanism
 Theory and History of Architecture, Art and Design
 Urban Architecture
 Urban Design and Housing
 Urban Design
 Urban Development
 Visual Arts

Rankings 

The 2021 QS World University Rankings have rated the TUM Department of Architecture as the 21st best architecture school in the world and the 2nd best in Germany.

In the national 2020 CHE University Ranking, the department is rated in the top group for the majority of criteria, including overall study situation and support in studies.

Department of Civil & Environmental Engineering 

The Department of Civil & Environmental Engineering (CEE) is located at the Munich campus.

Chairs 
The department consists of four focus areas and associated members:
 Construction
 Building Physics
 Energy Efficient and Sustainable Design and Building
 Soil Mechanics and Foundation Engineering, Rock Mechanics and Tunneling
 Timber Structures and Building Construction
 Concrete and Masonry Structures
 Metal Structures
 Mineral Construction Materials
 Materials Science and Testing
 Non-destructive Testing

 Mobility & Transportation Systems
 Traffic Engineering and Control
 Road, Railway and Airfield Construction
 Transportation Systems Engineering
 Urban Structure and Transport Planning
 Modeling Spatial Mobility

 Modeling – Simulation – Processes
 Construction Management
 Structural Mechanics
 Computational Mechanics
 Computational Modeling and Simulation
 Hydromechanics
 Real Estate Management
 Engineering Risk Analysis
 Structural Analysis

 Hydro- and Geosciences
 Geothermal Technologies
 Landslide Research
 Hydrogeology
 Hydrology and River Basin Management
 Engineering Geology
 Urban Water Systems Engineering
 Hydraulic and Water Resources Engineering

 Associated Members
 Hydrochemistry
 Strategic Landscape Planning and Management
 Construction Chemistry
 Wood Technology
 Environmental Sensing and Modeling
 Digital Fabrication
 Cartography
 Geodesy
 Geoinformatics
 Land Management
 Astronomical and Physical Geodesy
 Satellite Geodesy
 Geodetic Geodynamics
 Photogrammetry and Remote Sensing
 Remote Sensing Technology
 Signal Processing in Earth Observation

Rankings 

In civil engineering, QS ranks TUM as No. 49 in the world and No. 1 in Germany in 2022. ARWU ranks TUM within No. 201–300 in the world and No. 2-5 in Germany. 

In the environmental sciences, QS ranks TUM as No. 58 in the world and No. 1 in Germany. ARWU ranks TUM as No. 15 in the world and No. 1 in Germany. 

The Times Higher Education World University Rankings does not rank individual subjects, though in engineering in general, TUM is ranked 20th globally and 1st nationally.

Department of Mechanical Engineering 

The Department of Mechanical Engineering (MEC) is located in Garching.

History

19th century 
Mechanical engineering was one of the original departments of the newly founded Polytechnische Schule München in 1868, then called the Mechanical-Technical Department. Johann Bauschinger was professor for Technical Mechanics and Graphical Statics. In 1871, he founded the Mechanical-Technical Laboratory. He was succeeded by August Föppl in 1894.

Carl von Linde, who held the Chair of Theoretical Machine Science, established the Laboratory of Machine Science in 1875. Moritz Schröter, a distinguished expert in the field of technical thermodynamics, succeeded him in 1879. In 1902, von Linde returned as associate professor of Applied Thermodynamics. On his initiative, the Laboratory for Technical Physics was established.

In 1880, Rudolf Diesel graduated with the best marks since the university was established. His invention of the Diesel engine was a groundbreaking innovation, despite his initial calculations about the degree of efficiency being far too optimistic.

20th century 
In 1901, the first chair of electrical engineering was established at the department. Though initially viewed as a part of mechanical engineering, it grew increasingly more independent. In the 1940s, the department's name was changed to Department of Mechanical and Electrical Engineering, and by 1974, electrical engineering was separated into a new department.

Willy Messerschmitt graduated from the department in 1923. He established the Messerschmitt Flugzeugbau GmbH while still a student, which would later become the Messerschmitt AG in 1938. In 1930, he was granted a lectureship on the construction and design of aircraft, and in 1937, he was appointed honorary professor.

In Nazi Germany, the university was brought into line, partly by force, partly by conviction, and partly out of anticipatory obedience. Jewish members and those with politically undesirable views were expelled.

During World War II, the department conducted large-scale research in support of the war effort, for example in the fields of aircraft design, torpedo propulsion, petrol injection and substitute fuels for car and aircraft engines.

After the war, teaching resumed in 1946, though denazification expelled 13 of 24 lecturers, four of whom which were reinstated by 1953. The chairs for aviation research were shut down and did not operate again until the Paris Agreements ended Allied occupation of Germany.

In 1951, Gustav Niemann established the Chair of Machine Elements. In 1967, the founding of the Institute of Machine Tools and Industrial Engineering instigated a shift to research to information technology and production engineering.

By 1990, almost 5,000 students were enrolled at the Department of Mechanical Engineering. In 1997, the department relocated to a new 60,000 m2 building on the Garching campus.

21st century 
In 2018, aerospace and geodesy at TUM became a separate Department of Aerospace and Geodesy.

Chairs 
As of 2020, there are 39 chairs at the Department:
 Aerodynamics and Fluid Mechanics
 Applied Mechanics
 Automatic Control
 Automation and Information Systems
 Automotive Technology
 Biochemical Engineering
 Biomechanics
 Bioseparation Engineering
 Computational Mechanics
 Continuum Mechanics
 Cyber-Physical Systems in Production Engineering
 Energy Systems
 Ergonomics
 Flow Control and Aeroacoustics
 Industrial Management and Assembly Technologies
 Internal Combustion Engines
 Laser Based Additive Manufacturing
 Machine Elements
 Machine Tools and Manufacturing Technology
 Materials Engineering of Additive Manufacturing
 Materials Handling, Material Flow, Logistics
 Materials Science and Mechanics of Materials
 Mechanics and High Performance Computing
 Medical Materials and Implants
 Metal Forming and Casting
 Micro Technology and Medical Device Technology
 Multiscale Modeling of Fluid Materials
 Non-Destructive Testing
 Nuclear Technology
 Plant and Process Technology
 Plasma Material Interaction
 Product Development and Lightweight Design
 Production and Technology in Media
 Sport Equipment and Materials
 Systems Biotechnology
 Thermodynamics
 Thermo-Fluid Dynamics
 Vibroacoustics of Vehicles and Machines
 Wind Energy

Rankings 

In Engineering – Mechanical, Aeronautical & Manufacturing, the QS World University Rankings rank TUM as No. 21 in the world and No. 2 in Germany. The Academic Ranking of World Universities ranks the department within No. 101–150 in the world and No. 4–6 in Germany.

The Times Higher Education World University Rankings does not rank individual subjects, though in engineering in general, TUM is ranked 20th globally and 1st nationally.

Notable people 

Notable people include:
 Rudolf Diesel, inventor of the Diesel engine
 Claude Dornier, airplane designer
 Carl von Linde, discoverer of the refrigeration cycle
 Willy Messerschmitt, aircraft designer, known for the Messerschmitt fighters
 Oskar von Miller, engineer, founder of the Deutsches Museum

References

External links 
 

 
2021 establishments in Germany
Educational institutions established in 2021
Engineering education in Germany
Mechanical engineering schools
Architecture schools in Germany